González Municipality may refer to:

 González Municipality, Tamaulipas
 González Municipality, Colombia

Municipality name disambiguation pages